Jason Adasiewicz (born October 14, 1977) is an American jazz vibraphonist and composer.

Early life and education
Jason was born in Wichita, Kansas in 1977, but raised in Crystal Lake, Illinois. He studied jazz drums at DePaul University for three years.

Career 
Adasiewicz began playing the vibraphone after leaving school, first in the indie-rock scene around Chicago with bands like Pinetop Seven and the singer-songwriter Edith Frost.

In the early-2000s, Adasiewicz began his collaboration with cornetist Josh Berman and drummer Mike Reed. Since then he was worked in the Chicago jazz and improvisation scene with multiple bands, including Rob Mazurek’s Starlicker and Exploding Star Orchestra, Mike Reed’s Loose Assembly,  Josh Berman and His Gang, Nicole Mitchell’s Ice Crystal, James Falzone’s Klang and Ken Vandermark’s Topology and Audio One.

Adasiewicz formed his Chicago-based jazz quintet, Rolldown, in 2004, while living in Madison. In 2008 he founded the trio Sun Rooms, with Nate McBride and Mike Reed.

Discography

As leader/co-leader

As sideman

References

External links
Official site
Jason Adasiewicz’s Violent Vibes at Wondering Sound
Punk-rock move pays off for vibraphonist Jason Adasiewicz at Chicago Tribune

1977 births
Living people
Jazz vibraphonists
People from Crystal Lake, Illinois
DePaul University alumni
Delmark Records artists